Chris Hunt is a British journalist, magazine editor, and author.

Chris Hunt may also refer to:

Chris Hunt (badminton) (born 1968), English badminton player
Christopher Hunt, bookseller

See also 
Chris Hunter (disambiguation)